Montenero Sabino is a  (municipality) in the Province of Rieti in the Italian region of Latium, located about  northeast of Rome and about  southwest of Rieti.

Among the landmarks in town are the Castello Orsini and the parish church of San Cataldo.

References

Cities and towns in Lazio